Gongnong District is a district of the city of Hegang, Heilongjiang province, People's Republic of China.

Administrative divisions 
Gongnong District is divided into 6 subdistricts. 
6 subdistricts
 Yucai, Hongqi, Xinnan, Hubin, Jiefang, Tuanjie

Notes and references 

Gongnong